Reunion is a 1989 British dramatic film based on the 1971 novel of the same name by Fred Uhlman, directed by Jerry Schatzberg from a screenplay by Harold Pinter. It stars Jason Robards. The film was released in France under the title L' Ami Retrouvé and in Germany as Der wiedergefundene Freund.

The story is centred on the "enchanted friendship" of two teenagers in 1933 Germany. Hans Strauss (Christien Anholt) is the son of a Jewish doctor and Konradin Von Lohenburg (Samuel West) is from an aristocratic family. The background is the rise of Nazism. Jason Robards plays the older Hans in the 1970s as he prepares to travel to Germany for the first time since the 1930s.  The film was shot on location in Berlin, New York and Stuttgart.  Reunion was nominated for a Golden Palm at the 1989 Cannes Film Festival.

Plot
American lawyer Henry Strauss (Robards) is preparing to return to Germany for the first time since he left in 1933 following Adolf Hitler's rise to power. He is seeking to renew an "enchanting friendship" of his youth with aristocrat Konradin Von Lohenburg (West).

Strauss was the son of a Jewish doctor and the friends did not see that around them the rise of Nazism would lead to their separation. Their travels together and philosophical discussions against the elegant background of 1930s Stuttgart form the main part of the film, told in flashback.

The older Henry's search for his childhood friend leads to a startling revelation as he discovers what became of Konradin after Hitler took power.

Cast
 Jason Robards as Henry (formerly Hans) Strauss, as an old man
 Christien Anholt as Hans Strauss, as a young man
 Samuel West as Count Konradin von Lohenburg
 Françoise Fabian as Countess von Lohenburg, Konradin's mother
 Jacques Brunet as Count von Lohenburg, Konradin's father
 Bert Parnaby as Dr. Jakob Strauss, Hans' father
 Barbara Jefford as Frau Strauss, Hans' mother
 Shebah Ronay as Countess Gertrud, as a young woman
 Dorothea Alexander as Countess Gertrud, as an old woman
 Maureen Kerwin as Lisa, Henry's daughter
 Frank Baker - The Zionist
 Tim Barker as Zimmermann, a teacher
 Imke Barnstedt as Girl in Tax Building
 Gideon Boulting as Prince Hubertus
 Alan Bowyer as Bollacher
 Rupert Degas as Muller
 Robert Dietl - Gardener at Old Grafin's
 Nicholas Pandolfi as Reutter
  as Judge Freisler on TV

Critical reception
Time Out said of the film - "This moving rendition of Fred Uhlman's novel, about boyhood friendship betrayed under the destructive momentum of Nazism, shows Schatzberg at his (albeit limited) best." "Harold Pinter's tight and unobtrusive script, Trauner's fine production design and Philippe Sarde's muted but expressive score ensure a feeling of all-round professionalism."
The New York Times said "'Reunion' is gratifying in the small ways most familiar from public-television's depictions of English upper-class behavior. The offhanded elegance of its settings, and the attractive crispness of its schoolboy manners ("Oh, he just rants and raves, doesn't he?" one of the film's cavalier young characters says about Hitler) are a major part of its gently decorative appeal."
Channel 4 said "Nothing in Schatzberg's filmography makes the heart leap, but this film - adapted by Pinter from an autobiographical novel by Ulman - stands out above the rest. It's a quietly decent film that takes place primarily (via a flashback) in the early 1930s."

Notes

External links

Presentation of the film by Jerry Schatzberg Festival Lumière, October 2013

1989 films
1980s buddy drama films
1989 drama films
British buddy drama films
French drama films
West German films
1980s English-language films
English-language French films
English-language German films
Films directed by Jerry Schatzberg
Films scored by Philippe Sarde
Films set in Germany
Films set in West Germany
Films set in 1932
Films set in 1933
Films set in the 1970s
Films with screenplays by Harold Pinter
1980s British films
1980s French films